Mrs. Alex. McVeigh Miller (Point; after first marriage, Davis; after second marriage, Miller; April 30, 1850 – December 26, 1937) was the pen name of Mittie Frances Clarke Point, an American novelist. She wrote 80 dime novels during a 50-year career.  Her first novel was Rosamond, but her success began with the 1883 romance, The Bride of the Tomb. She died in 1937. In 1978, her home, "The Cedars", was listed on the National Register of Historic Places.

Biography
Mittie Frances Clarke Point was born in Doswell, Virginia, April 30, 1850. Her parents were Charles J. Point and Mary G. (Crow) Point.

She graduated from Richmond Female Institute on June 30, 1868.

She first married Thomas Jefferson Davis and they had a daughter, but both husband and daughter died within two years. Returning to her home in Richmond, Virginia, she wrote short stories for Old Dominion and Temperance Advocate. She then married a teacher named Alexander McVeigh Miller in 1878 and they lived in Fayette County, West Virginia. Her 1883 romance, The Bride of the Tomb, was successful, and others followed. The Millers built "The Cedars" in Alderson, West Virginia, and this also helped him with a political career, having been elected to the West Virginia Senate during the period of 1901 to 1909. She divorced him in 1908 because of infidelity, moving with her daughter Irene to Boston. She died in Florida, December 26, 1937.

Selected works

 188?, An old man's darling
 188?, The mystery of Suicide Place
 1882, Lady Gay's pride, or, Only a broken heart
 1883, Sworn to silence, or, A burdensome secret
 1883, Jaquelina, or, The outlaw's bride
 1883, Little Goldens̓ daughter, or, The dream of her life-time
 1883, Bonnie Dora : or, Winning the heir
 1883, The bride of the tomb ; and, Queenie's terrible secret
 1883, The bride of the tomb; or, Lancelot Darling's betrothed
 1883, A dreadful temptation, or, A young wife's ambition
 1883, Sworn to silence, or, Aline Rodney's secret
 1883, Guy Kenmore's wife; or, Her mother's secret
 1884, The pearl and the ruby, or, The beautiful rivals
 1884, Lady Gay's pride; or, The miser's treasure
 1886, Molly's treachery
 1886, Little Nobody
 1887, Flower and Jewel; or, Daisy Forrest's daughter
 1888, Brunette and blonde, or, The struggle for a birthright
 1889, Little Sweetheart : or, Norman De Vere's protegee
 1891, Kathleen's diamonds : or, She loved a handsome actor 
 1892, Eric Braddon's love
 1892, Little Coquette Bonnie : or, crossed in love. Chapters I-XI
 1892, Tiger-lily; or, The woman who came between
 1896, A dreadful temptation, and Countess Vera
 1896, Bonnie Dora and Little Golden's daughter
 1896, The strength of love, or, An unbidden guest
 1896, Queenie's terrible secret, and the rose and the lily
 1896, When we two parted, or, Among love's rapids
 1897, Loved you better than you knew
 1897, The senator's bride
 1898, Lancaster's choice
 1898, Dainty's cruel rivals : or, The fatal birthday
 1894,  Lillian, my Lillian, or, Queen of the comic opera
 1896, Lynette's wedding, or, Married and parted
 1887, Mabel's fate, or, A broken betrothal
 1891, What was she to him? or, Virginia King's heart
 1885, Cruelly divided, or, A plot for a fortune
 1886, Little Vixen, or, When two loves conflict
 1887, My little love, or, Swept away by passion
 1893, A little Southern beauty, or, Tortured hearts
 1895, The senator's favorite
 1899, My pretty maid, or, Liane Lester
 1884, Where love dwelt, or, The two brides' fate
 1885, Tempted by gold, or, A life and love wasted
 1888, Loyal unto death, or, Roselle's true love
 1898, My pretty maid, or, Her dangerous secret
 1899, A married flirt, or, Pride and its penalty
 1888, The man she hated, or, Won by strategy
 1888, The man she hated, or, Won by strategy
 1892, They looked and loved, or, Won by faith
 1896, When we two parted, or, A heart's tragedy
 1898, Pretty madcap Lucy, or, The shadows over her
 1898, Slighted love, or, At her heart's expense
 1899, The thorns of regret, or, His brother's wife
 1889, Rosamond, or, Sundered hearts
 1900, Only a kiss, or, Cast out
 1900, The shadow between them, or, A blighted name
 1900, Only a kiss, or, With her whole heart
 1901, Love is love forevermore, or, A triumph of two true hearts
 1901, The unbidden guest, or, Between two passions
 1901, The price of happiness, or, The triumph of two true hearts
 1902, Nina's peril : or, The fowler's snares
 1905, The sword of Damocles
 1902, The fatal kiss, or, Her evil genius
 1901, Her husband's secret, or, Bought and paid for
 1903, All for love, or, Her heart's sacrifice
 1911, That girl named Hazel
 1917, Her life's burden : or, The road of the wicked
 1917, Her sister's secret, or, The chain of fate
 1919, What was she to him? or, Her evil shadow

References

Attribution

Bibliography

External links
 
 
 

1850 births
1937 deaths
19th-century American women writers
19th-century American novelists
20th-century American writers
20th-century American women writers
19th-century pseudonymous writers
20th-century pseudonymous writers
Dime novelists
American women novelists
Pseudonymous women writers
People from Hanover County, Virginia
Novelists from Virginia